Masada is an American television miniseries that aired on ABC in April 1981. Advertised by the network as an "ABC Novel for Television," it was a fictionalized account of the historical siege of the Masada citadel in Israel by legions of the Roman Empire in AD 73. The TV series' script is based on the 1971 novel The Antagonists by Ernest Gann, with a screenplay written by Joel Oliansky. The siege ended when the Roman armies entered the fortress, only to discover the mass suicide by the Jewish defenders when defeat became imminent.

The miniseries starred Peter O'Toole as Roman legion commander Lucius Flavius Silva, Peter Strauss as the Jewish commander Eleazar ben Ya'ir, and Barbara Carrera as Silva's Jewish mistress. It was O'Toole's first appearance in an American miniseries.

Masada was one of several historical miniseries produced in the early 1980s following the success of the miniseries Roots that aired on the ABC Network in 1977 and Shogun which aired on NBC in 1980.

Plot

Part I
In the year 70 AD, with the fall of Jerusalem and the destruction of the Second Temple, the Jewish rebellion against Roman occupation is declared over, but Eleazar ben Ya'ir and his family flee the city, vowing that the Judean War is not ended. Eleazar and his followers make their headquarters on top of the mountain fortress of Masada. From there they conduct raids on Roman occupied villages in the south of Judea. These guerrilla attacks threaten the credibility of the declared Roman victory. The commanding general of the 10th Legion, Cornelius Flavius Silva, arranges a meeting with Eleazar to negotiate a truce. Returning to Rome, Silva's hopes to implement a truce in Judea are quashed by the Emperor Vespasian, because of political pressures in the Roman Senate. Silva is sent back to Judea after securing the services of veteran Siege Commander Rubrius Gallus. Silva is also informed that his second in command, General Marcus Quadratus, and Head Tribune Merovius, are spies for the emperor's political enemy. While Silva is still in Rome, through the treachery of these two men, the truce is violently broken by the Romans.

Part II
Learning of the breaking of the truce upon his return from Rome, Silva marches the 5,000 men of the 10th Legion to the foot of Masada and lays a siege to the apparently impregnable fortress. He directs Quadratus and Merovius on a suicidal assault of the fortress in order to remove them from his forces and make them an example to any others who share their political leanings. Rubrius Gallus directs that a ramp be built to almost the summit of the mountain, intent on breaking through the Masada walls with the aid of a 50-foot (15.24 m) siege tower that is being constructed out of sight of the rebels. When Eleazar successfully attacks the Roman soldiers building the ramp with catapulted stones, Silva quickly rounds up hundreds of Jews from the surrounding area to use as slaves to continue the work, believing correctly that Eleazar will not attack fellow Jews.  This makes Eleazar change his tactics to psychological warfare, allowing the heat of the sun and revealing the surplus of water on Masada to demoralize the Roman troops. Also, he acts to capitalize on the Romans' belief in reading the future from the entrails of sacrificed goats, leading a party through the Roman sentries at night to feed the goats maggots, knowing that their discovery during the rituals will be seen as a bad omen. Eleazar's problems are further compounded by his own religious doubts and opposition from the more pacifist groups on Masada.

Part III
The political opportunist Pomponius Falco arrives and under the authority of the Emperor Vespasian relieves Silva as legion commander. Intent on ending the siege quickly through the use of terror, Falco orders Jewish slaves to be killed one by one, by catapulting them into the side of the mountain, until Eleazar surrenders. Eleazar, a religious skeptic, runs to the Masada synagogue and calls to God to stop the killing. Revolted by Falco's barbaric actions, Silva forcibly takes back his command, stops the catapulting, and orders Falco placed under arrest. The cessation of Falco's terror is seen by the Zealots as a response to Eleazar's praying and affirmation of his leadership to them. Rubrius Gallus is killed by a Masadan arrow as he carries out measurements on the siege ramp, only living long enough to confirm his plans to his second in command.

Part IV
As the ramp nears completion, Eleazar faces the fact that the final confrontation with the Romans is not far off. The Zealots break into Herod's Armory and begin to prepare for what they believe will be a straightforward storming of the fortress walls by the Romans. When the ramp is complete, the Romans wheel out the armoured siege tower and battering-ram. Eleazar then realizes that he had underestimated Silva's strategy. As the tower begins moving up the ramp, Eleazar has his people build "an inner wall that will absorb the blows of the ram and not shatter." Made from wooden beams from Herod's Palace roof and packed with dirt, they finish it just as the tower reaches the top of the ramp. The Romans quickly break through the stone walls of the fortress, but the ram does nothing against the improvised inner wall. As the wall is made partly of wood, Silva orders his men to set fire to it.  Deducing that it would take all night for the wall to burn through, Silva has his men stand down; the rest of the night is tense for both sides, as the fitful wind may as easily spread the blaze to the siege tower as burn down the inner wall. The next day, the Romans break into the fortress, only to discover that Eleazar and his people had all committed suicide during the night.

The closing line is said by a dispirited and despondent Silva, who mourns all that has been hoped and planned and lost by both sides whilst fighting for "a rock, in the middle of a wasteland, on the shore of a poisoned sea...".

Cast

Peter O'Toole        – Lucius Flavius Silva
Peter Strauss        – Eleazar Ben Yair
Barbara Carrera      – Sheva
Anthony Quayle       – Rubrius Gallus
David Warner         – Pomponius Falco
Nigel Davenport      – Mucianus
Timothy West         – Emperor Vespasian
Alan Feinstein       – Aaron
George Innes         – Titus
Giulia Pagano        – Miriam
Clive Francis        – Attius
Warren Clarke       – Plinius
Vernon Dobtcheff     – Roman Chief Priest
Michael Elphick      – Vettius
Christopher Biggins  – Claudius Albinus
Nick Brimble         – Milades
Joe Sagal            – Seth
Paul L. Smith        – Gideon
David Opatoshu       – Shimon
Denis Quilley        – General Marcus Quadratus
Jack Watson – Decurion
W. Morgan Sheppard   – Roman Sergeant
Norman Rossington    – Maro
Joseph Wiseman       – Jerahmeel, Head Essene
Anthony Valentine    – Merovius, Head Tribune
Ken Hutchison        – Fronto
Patrick Gorman       – Tribune
Ray Smith – Lentius, would be assassin
Kevin McNally        – Norbanus
Richard Basehart     – Narrator (Prologue and Epilogue)

Production
Masada was filmed on location at the site of the ancient fortress, in the Judean Desert, Israel. Remains of a ramp, created during the filming to simulate the ramp built by the Romans to take the fortress, can still be seen at the site. ABC, concerned that the audience would be unfamiliar with the historical background of the story, commissioned a 30-minute documentary, Back To Masada. Starring Peter O'Toole, it recounts the history of the Jewish revolt against Rome. The network gave the documentary to its affiliates to run in the weeks before the premiere of the miniseries.

Soundtrack
The music for Parts I and II were composed by Jerry Goldsmith. Because of myriad production delays, Goldsmith was forced to move on to other previously contracted scoring commitments. Parts III and IV were composed by Morton Stevens, based on the themes and motifs Goldsmith had written.

In 1981 MCA Records released on vinyl and cassette a re-recording of selections of Goldsmith's music performed by the UK's National Philharmonic Orchestra under the composer's baton; Intrada Records issued a 2-CD set of the original recording of the complete score in 2011, followed by a more expansive 4-CD set (with alternates, unreleased material, and the original album version) in 2021.

Awards and nominations
 The miniseries was nominated for the Primetime Emmy Award for Outstanding Limited Series and Golden Globe Award for Best Miniseries or Television Film. 
 Peter O'Toole and Peter Strauss were both nominated for the Primetime Emmy Award for Outstanding Lead Actor in a Limited Series or Special and Golden Globe Award for Best Actor in a Limited Series or Motion Picture made for Television. 
 David Warner, as Pomponius Falco, received a Primetime Emmy Award for Outstanding Supporting Actor in a Limited Series or a Special. 
 Joel Oliansky was awarded the Writers Guild of America Award for Television: Long Form – Multi-part and was nominated for the Primetime Emmy Award for Outstanding Writing in a Limited Series or a Special. 
 Jerry Goldsmith won the Primetime Emmy Award for Outstanding Achievement in Music Composition for a Limited Series or a Special for his score to Part II, with Morton Stevens nominated for his score to Part IV. 
 The series, cast and crew garnered nominations for eight additional Emmys.

Home media
As was the case with Shogun, an edited, feature film-length version of the miniseries was made for theatrical release in other countries under the title The Antagonists. This was the version that was initially available on home video. The complete Masada miniseries first made it to the video market on four VHS tapes in 2001. A two-disc DVD release titled Masada — The Complete Epic Mini-Series was released on September 11, 2007. A Region 2 UK, two-disc DVD was released on 19 January 2009.

See also
The Dovekeepers
List of historical drama films
List of films set in ancient Rome

External links

Movie Review: Masada, The Prayer Foundation (described therein as "From the Video's Back Cover" with comments following).  Retrieved 8 November 2015.
Masada TV Mini-Series 

1981 American television series debuts
1981 American television series endings
1980s American television miniseries
American biographical series
American Broadcasting Company original programming
Television series about Jews and Judaism
American adventure television series
Television dramas set in ancient Rome
Television shows based on American novels
Television series by Universal Television
Television shows set in Israel
Masada
Television series set in the Roman Empire
Fiction set in the 1st century
Television series set in the 1st century
Films directed by Boris Sagal